Thimo Willems (born 9 February 1996) is a Belgian racing cyclist, who currently rides for UCI Continental team . In April 2019, he won the mountains classification at the 2019 Presidential Tour of Turkey.

Major results
2013
 2nd Overall Keizer der Juniores
 5th Overall Driedaagse van Axel
1st  Young rider classification
2014
 6th Overall Driedaagse van Axel
1st Stage 3
2018
 2nd Grand Prix des Marbriers
2019
 1st  Mountains classification, Tour of Turkey
2021
 7th Ronde van Drenthe
2022
 2nd Brussels Cycling Classic
 3rd Grand Prix Criquielion

References

External links

 

1996 births
Living people
Belgian male cyclists
People from Jette
21st-century Belgian people